The governor of Biliran is the local chief executive of the Philippine province of Biliran.  The governor holds office at the Biliran Provincial Capitol located at Brgy. Calumpang, Naval, Biliran. Like all local government heads in the Philippines, the governor is elected via popular vote, and may not be elected for a fourth consecutive term (although the former governor may return to office after an interval of one term). In case of death, resignation or incapacity, the vice governor becomes the governor.

The current governor is Rogelio J. Espina who was elected during the last May 13, 2019 local elections. He previously served as governor for 3 consecutive terms from 2001 to 2010.

History 
On April 15, 1959, President Carlos P. Garcia appointed Caibiran Mayor Uldarico R. Reyes as its first lieutenant governor of Biliran which was made as a sub-province of Leyte after the enactment of Republic Act No. 2141. Reyes assumed the position on October 25, 1959. Thereafter, the position was generally elected.

Subsequently, the title of lieutenant governor was changed into a governor on June 21, 1969 pursuant to Republic Act No. 5977 thereby giving the office holder the executive powers of a provincial governor.

List of governors 
This is the list of governors who served the province of Biliran since becoming a sub-province of Leyte to the present day:

Sub-province of Leyte 

Notes
 The title of lieutenant governor was changed into a governor on June 21, 1969 pursuant to Republic Act No. 5977.
 Term extended without election.
 Office-in-charge.
 Governor-appointee.

Province 

Notes
 Appointed.

References 

Governors of provinces of the Philippines
Biliran